The 2000–01 NBA season was the 55th season of the National Basketball Association. The season ended with the Los Angeles Lakers winning their second straight championship, beating the Philadelphia 76ers 4 games to 1 in the 2001 NBA Finals.

Notable occurrences

 The NBA All-Star Game was held at the MCI Center in Washington, D.C.. The East won 111–110, with Philadelphia's Allen Iverson being named the game's Most Valuable Player. The game is noted for the Eastern Conference's 21-point comeback in the fourth quarter.
 The Grizzlies play their final season in Vancouver, British Columbia before relocating to Memphis, Tennessee for the following season leaving the Toronto Raptors as the only Canadian team left in the NBA.
 Rick Pitino resigned as head coach and president of the Boston Celtics, ending a three-plus-year tenure filled with turmoil, disappointment and three consecutive below .500, non-playoff seasons.
 The Dallas Mavericks played their final season at Reunion Arena. They also made the playoffs for the first time since the 1989–90 season. They also made it past the first round for the first time since the 1987–88 season.
 The Los Angeles Lakers win their second straight title by going 15–1 in the playoffs, then the best playoff winning percentage in NBA history (later surpassed by the 2017 Golden State Warriors).
 The Toronto Raptors made the second round of the playoffs for the first time in franchise history, winning over New York 3–2. They lost in the second round to Philadelphia 4–3.
 Prior to the season, Miami Heat center Alonzo Mourning announced that he suffered a kidney disorder and missed the first five months of the season. Mourning would receive a kidney transplant two years later.
To date, this was the last time a team with the best regular season record did not win 60 or more games in a full 82-game season. The San Antonio Spurs finished with the league's best record at 58–24. Though the 2011–12 Chicago Bulls and the 2011–12 San Antonio Spurs each won 50 games and the top conference seeds, they did so during a 66-game lockout-shortened regular season.
 Effective of this season, the league now permitted players to wear knee-length shorts by default, although players like John Stockton opted to continue wearing short shorts during the season. This would be the case for other players in the future as players like Chris Douglas-Roberts in the 2014–15 season and LeBron James for some of the 2015–16 season would opt to wear short shorts.
Three teams in the Western Conference who missed the playoffs won 40 or more games. The ninth-placed Houston Rockets finished the season with a 45–37 record, the tenth-placed Seattle SuperSonics finished with a 44–38 record, and the eleventh-placed Denver Nuggets ended the season with a 40–42 record.

2000–01 NBA changes
 The Los Angeles Clippers changed their uniforms, added side panels to their jerseys and shorts.
 The New Jersey Nets slightly changed their alternate uniforms.
 The Orlando Magic changed their logo.
 The Philadelphia 76ers slightly changed their uniforms.
 The Phoenix Suns changed their logo and uniforms, added side panels to their jerseys and shorts, adding grey to their color scheme.
 The Vancouver Grizzlies changed their home uniforms, while the alternate uniforms became their primary road jersey.

Standings

By division

Eastern Conference

Western Conference

By conference

Notes
z – Clinched home court advantage for the entire playoffs
c – Clinched home court advantage for the conference playoffs
y – Clinched division title 
x – Clinched playoff spot

Playoffs
Teams in bold advanced to the next round. The numbers to the left of each team indicate the team's seeding in its conference, and the numbers to the right indicate the number of games the team won in that round. The division champions are marked by an asterisk. Home-court advantage does not necessarily belong to the higher-seeded team, but instead the team with the better regular season record; teams enjoying the home advantage are shown in italics.

Statistics leaders

Awards

Yearly awards
Most Valuable Player: Allen Iverson, Philadelphia 76ers
Rookie of the Year: Mike Miller, Orlando Magic
Defensive Player of the Year: Dikembe Mutombo, Philadelphia 76ers/Atlanta Hawks
Sixth Man of the Year: Aaron McKie, Philadelphia 76ers
Most Improved Player: Tracy McGrady, Orlando Magic
Coach of the Year: Larry Brown, Philadelphia 76ers
Executive of the Year: Geoff Petrie, Sacramento Kings
Sportsmanship Award: David Robinson, San Antonio Spurs

All-NBA First Team:
F – Tim Duncan, San Antonio Spurs
F – Chris Webber, Sacramento Kings
C – Shaquille O'Neal, Los Angeles Lakers
G – Allen Iverson, Philadelphia 76ers
G – Jason Kidd, Phoenix Suns

All-NBA Second Team:
F – Kevin Garnett, Minnesota Timberwolves
F – Vince Carter, Toronto Raptors
C – Dikembe Mutombo, Philadelphia 76ers
G – Kobe Bryant, Los Angeles Lakers
G – Tracy McGrady, Orlando Magic

All-NBA Third Team:
F – Karl Malone, Utah Jazz
F – Dirk Nowitzki, Dallas Mavericks
C – David Robinson, San Antonio Spurs
G – Gary Payton, Seattle SuperSonics
G – Ray Allen, Milwaukee Bucks

NBA All-Defensive First Team:
Tim Duncan, San Antonio Spurs
Kevin Garnett, Minnesota Timberwolves
Dikembe Mutombo, Philadelphia 76ers
Gary Payton, Seattle SuperSonics
Jason Kidd, Phoenix Suns

All-Defensive Second Team:
Bruce Bowen, Miami Heat
P. J. Brown, Charlotte Hornets
Shaquille O'Neal, Los Angeles Lakers
Kobe Bryant, Los Angeles Lakers
Doug Christie, Sacramento Kings

NBA All-Rookie First Team:
Mike Miller, Orlando Magic
Kenyon Martin, New Jersey Nets
Marc Jackson, Golden State Warriors
Morris Peterson, Toronto Raptors
Darius Miles, Los Angeles Clippers

All-Rookie Second Team:
Hedo Türkoğlu, Sacramento Kings
Desmond Mason, Seattle SuperSonics
Courtney Alexander, Washington Wizards
Marcus Fizer, Chicago Bulls
Chris Mihm, Cleveland Cavaliers

Players of the month
The following players were named the Players of the Month.

Rookies of the month
The following players were named the Rookies of the Month.

Coaches of the month
The following coaches were named Coaches of the Month.

Notes

References

 
NBA
2000–01 in Canadian basketball